Margaret of Thuringia or Margaret of Saxony (1449 – 13 July 1501) was a German noblewoman, Electress of Brandenburg by marriage.

She was the daughter of William III, Landgrave of Thuringia and Anne of Austria, Duchess of Luxembourg suo jure.

Family and children
On 15 August 1476, in Berlin, she married John Cicero, Elector of Brandenburg.  They had the following children:
 Wolfgang, born and died 1482.
 Joachim I Nestor (21 February 1484–11 July 1535), Elector Brandenburg.
 Elisabeth, born and died 1486.
 Albert (1490, Berlin–24 September 1545, Mainz), Cardinal since 1518, Archbishop of Magdeburg in 1513-14, Archbishop of Mainz in 1514-45.
 Anna (27 August 1487, Berlin–3 May 1514, Kiel), married 10 April 1502 to the future King Frederick I of Denmark (she was never queen consort, since she died before her husband's accession).
 Ursula (17 October 1488–18 September 1510, Güstrow), married 16 February 1507 to Henry V, Duke of Mecklenburg.

References

|-

1449 births
1501 deaths
15th-century German people
15th-century German women
Nobility from Weimar
House of Wettin
Electresses of Brandenburg
Daughters of monarchs